Seán Hawes (born 1980 in Cratloe, County Clare, Ireland) is an Irish sportsperson.

References

1980 births
Living people
Cratloe hurlers
Clare inter-county hurlers
Antrim inter-county hurlers
Hurling goalkeepers